Michelinoceras is the oldest known genus of the Michelinocerida, more commonly known as the Orthocerida, characterized by long, slender, nearly cylindrical orthocones with a circular cross section, long camerae, very long body chambers, and a central or near central tubular siphuncle free of organic deposits. Septal necks are straight; connecting rings cylindrical and thin. Cameral deposits are well developed. A radula has been found in one species, with seven teeth per row.  It had ten arms, two of which formed longer tentacles.

Range
Michelinoceras ranges from late in the Early Ordovician to the Devonian with more poorly known species from the Carboniferous to the Late Triassic included in the genus. The earliest known unequivocal species is Michelinoceras primum found in  Cassinian age strata near the top of the Lower Ordovician El Paso Group in southern New Mexico and west Texas. A less well known species of Michelinoceras, M. primum?, comes from further down in the same formation, near the beginning of the Cassinian.

Taxonomy and derivation
Michelinoceras named by Foeste in 1932 is the ancestral and characteristic genus of the Michelinoceratidae, established and described by Flower in 1946; derived from empty siphuncle Baltoceratidae.

See also
 List of nautiloids

References

Further reading 
 Flower, R.H. 1976; Ordovician Cephalopod Faunas and Their Role in Correlation, pp 538–541; proceedings pub. Paleontological Association, Gr Br. 
 Hook, J.C. and Flower, R.H. 1976; Tajaroceras and the Origin of the Troedsonnellidae. Jour Paleontology v 50, no 2, pp 293–300, March 1976
 Sweet, W.C, 1964; Michelinoceras, pp 225–226 in Orthoceratidae, pp 224–231 in the Treatise on Invertebrate Paleontology Vol K. GSA and Univ Kansas Press.

Excellent descriptions in:
 RISTEDT, H. 1971. Zum Bau der orthoceriden Cephalopoden. Palaeontographica A, 137:155-195
 KISELEV, G. N. 1971. Embryonalnye rakoviny silurskich michelinoceratin. Voprosy Paleontologii, 6:41-5
 SERPAGLI, E., AND M. GNOLI. 1977. Upper Silurian cephalopods from southwestern Sardinia. Bollettino della Societh Paleontologica Italiana, 16:153-196

Orthocerida
Ordovician cephalopods
Silurian cephalopods
Devonian cephalopods
Early Ordovician first appearances
Devonian extinctions
Prehistoric cephalopods of North America
Fossils of Georgia (U.S. state)
Paleozoic life of Ontario
Paleozoic life of Quebec